Roslyn may refer to:

People
 Louis Frederick Roslyn (1878–1940), British sculptor
 Roslyn Atkins (born 1974),  British journalist and broadcaster for the BBC

Places
 Roslyn, Palmerston North, a suburb of the city of Palmerston North, North Island, New Zealand
 Roslyn, Dunedin, a suburb of the city of Dunedin, South Island, New Zealand
 Roslyn (New Zealand electorate), a former electorate 
 Roslyn, New York, a village on the North Shore of Long Island in Nassau County, New York, United States 
 Roslyn, Pennsylvania, a community in Montgomery County, Pennsylvania, United States 
 Roslyn, South Dakota, a town in Day County, South Dakota United States
 Roslyn, Washington, a city in Kittitas County, Washington, United States
 Roslyn, a fictional English seaside town in the novel Eric, or, Little by Little (1858)

Computing
 Roslyn (compiler), Microsoft's language tooling for C# and Visual Basic .NET

Transportation
Roslyn station (Pittsburgh Regional Transit), a bus rapid transit station in Pittsburgh, Pennsylvania, USA
Roslyn station (SEPTA), a SEPTA Regional Rail station in Roslyn, Pennsylvania, USA
Roslyn station (LIRR), a Long Island Rail Road station in Roslyn, New York, USA
Roslyn railway station, New South Wales, a railway station in Roslyn, New South Wales, Australia
North Roslyn station (LIRR), former Long Island Rail Road station

See also
 Roslyn Air National Guard Station, a former  Air National Guard Station in Roslyn, New York, United States
Roslyn Overbridge, a bridge in Dunedin, New Zealand
Roslin (disambiguation)
Roslin, Midlothian, sometimes spelt Rosslyn or Roslyn
Rosalyn (disambiguation)
Rosslyn (disambiguation)